Pavlík (feminine Pavlíková) is a Czech and Slovak surname. Notable people with the surname include:

 Eva Pavlíková (born 1960), Slovak actress
 John Leon Pavlik, aka Johnny Powers (born 1938), American rockabilly singer
 John Vernon Pavlik, American academic and author
 Josef Pavlík (1885–unknown), Czech sports shooter
 Jozef Pavlík (born 1973), Slovak footballer
 Kelly Pavlik (born 1982), American boxer
 Milada Pavlíková (1895–1985), Czech architect
 Roger Pavlik (born 1967), American baseball player
 Karel Pavlík (1900–1943), Czechoslovak Army captain
 Gorazd (Pavlík) (1879–1942), hierarch of the revived Orthodox Church in Moravia
 Petr Pavlík (footballer, born 1978), Czech football player
 Petr Pavlík (footballer born 1987), Czech football player

Given name
 Pavlik Morozov (1918–1932), murdered Russian child used in Soviet propaganda

See also
 

Czech-language surnames
Slovak-language surnames